These hits topped the Dutch Top 40 in 1969.

See also
1969 in music

References

1969 in the Netherlands
1969 record charts
1969